Valid when made (also sometimes valid-when-made) is a United States legal doctrine which holds that the terms of a loan, if legally valid at the time of its creation, remain valid after the loan is sold or assigned to a third-party. Historically, the doctrine has often been applied to loans made by national banks and then transferred to secondary lenders. Under this doctrine, debt buyers may purchase loans from national banks and collect interest on them at the same rate as the original lender, without being prevented by their state's usury laws.

The doctrine entered common law during the 19th century, and was codified in a final rule by the Office of the Comptroller of the Currency in 2020.

History 
The valid-when-made doctrine is held to have originated with Nichols v. Fearson, an 1833 case, which found that "a contract, which, in its inception, is unaffected by usury can never be invalidated by any subsequent usurious transaction." The doctrine became a part of common law after the National Bank Act was passed in 1864. The act maintained, among other things, that national banks could only be held to the usury laws in their charter state, rather than the home state of a borrower. Because of ambiguities in the language of the act, the courts generally treated the transfer of loans like the transfer of any other contract, allowing interest rates to remain fixed on loans which were sold or transferred. Under this model, protection from out-of-state usury laws was transferred with the loan.

The valid-when-made doctrine was partly upheld in the landmark 1978 case Marquette National Bank of Minneapolis v. First of Omaha Service Corp. In Marquette v. Omaha, the Supreme Court ruled that a nationally chartered bank could offer loans with the maximum interest rate allowed in its charter state to consumers in any other state, without being subject to another state's usury laws. This ruling led many large national banks to move to states with high interest rates. After the ruling, courts generally held that debt buyers could collect interest at the rate originally set, despite not being subject to the same protections as national banks. This dynamic became a major component of the "rate exportation model" of lending, under which national banks sold or transferred loans.

Madden v. Midland Funding, LLC (2015–2019) 
The case of Madden v. Midland Funding LLC in 2015 challenged the basic premise of valid when made doctrine. Regarding Madden, the U.S. Court of Appeals for the Second Circuit ruled that Midland Funding, LLC, a third-party debt buyer, could be subject to state usury laws after purchasing a loan from Bank of America, a protected national bank. The Solicitor General of the United States submitted a brief which argued that the court's finding had been in error, and was neither in keeping with the valid-when-made doctrine or with the position of other circuit courts. However, Midland was denied certiorari by the Supreme Court in 2016.

The Madden ruling immediately caused widespread uncertainty about the ability of banks to sell or transfer loans to third parties. In particular, it was criticized for making it more difficult for high risk, disadvantaged borrowers to obtain personal or business loans. The ruling also prompted concerns that loans which had previously been legal valid might become usurious, opening up secondary lenders to civil and criminal charges.

At the time of the decision, many legal and financial experts predicted that Madden would be limited in scope by subsequent rulings, including the American Bankers Association who urged the creation of a "Madden fix" law to protect valid when made. Multiple bills were proposed to implement a "Madden fix" law, including the Protecting Consumers’ Access to Credit Act 2017, which was passed by the U.S. House Of Representatives. Opponents of the "Madden fix" laws argued that the valid when made doctrine violated states' rights.

OCC and FDIC decisions (2019–present) 
In 2019, the Office of the Comptroller of the Currency (OCC) announced its intentions to reinforce valid when made. The OCC clarified that the interest rate of loans can remain intact after being sold to a secondary lender. The Federal Deposit Insurance Corporation (FDIC) also reaffirmed and codified valid when made doctrine, arguing that Madden was a "deviation from longstanding notions of contract law" and had created market instability.

On May 29, 2020, the OCC issued a final rule that codified valid when made. The rule was intended to address the legal ramifications of Madden and mitigate the damage to the secondary loan market. It stated that a loan which was not subject to a state usury law at the time of creation cannot subsequently become subject to it after being sold, transferred or assigned in any way.

The states of California, Illinois, and New York challenged the issuance of the rule, contending that the OCC had not considered the consequences of its ruling. This challenge was rejected by the U.S. District Court for the Northern District of California, which ruled in favor of the OCC on February 8, 2022.

See also 

 Assignment (law)

References 

Legal doctrines and principles
Common law rules
United States federal banking legislation
Financial regulation in the United States